Casey's Retail Company (doing business as Casey's) is a chain of convenience stores in the Midwestern and Southern United States. The company is headquartered in Ankeny, Iowa, a suburb of Des Moines. As of April 30, 2019, Casey's had 2,146 stores in 16 states. Following 7-Eleven's purchase of Speedway, Casey's is the 3rd largest convenience store chain in the United States (after 7-Eleven and Circle K) and the largest that is wholly American-owned. It is one of two Iowa-based Fortune 500 companies.

History
In 1959, Donald Lamberti leased a service station in Des Moines, Iowa, from his father. After successfully remodeling the station into a convenience store and operating it for nine years, his gasoline supplier and friend, Kurvin C. (K.C.) Fish, suggested that he purchase the Square Deal Oil Company, a service station available for sale in Boone, Iowa. Lamberti followed Fish's advice and purchased the station, which he renamed "Casey's" after Fish and as with his leased store converted the station into a convenience store. The logo on the Boone store was used by the chain until 2020.

The Boone store (located in a town of only 12,500) did well, so Lamberti decided to see if he could duplicate his success.  He built another store in Creston, Iowa (population 7,000), and that store did well also.  Lamberti became more ambitious and decided to open a store from scratch in the even smaller town of Waukee, Iowa (population 1,500 at the time).  The Waukee store proved to be the most successful of the three, so Lamberti decided to purchase and open more stores, concentrating on towns of less than 5,000 population (a variation on the tactic used in the early success of Wal-Mart).

1970s–1990s
By the late 1970s (when Casey's opened its first warehouse) the chain had 118 stores, including the original store operated by Lamberti's parents which entered the Casey's fold in 1977.

In 1982, Casey's opened its first Distribution Center in Urbandale, Iowa.

Casey's became a publicly traded company in October 1983, with an initial public offering of 700,000 shares.  Around this time Casey's began to sell doughnuts in its stores; in December 1984 it introduced pizza into its stores (which is one of its signature items today). Their pizza options include taco pizza.

In 1990, Casey's moved to its current facility in Ankeny, Iowa.

Casey's 1,000th store opened in Altoona, Iowa, in 1996, the same year Casey's exceeded US$1 billion in annual sales.

2000–present
In January 2006, Casey's purchased Lincoln, Nebraska-based Gas 'N Shop. On August 7, 2006, Casey's agreed to purchase the 33-store HandiMart chain, based in Cedar Rapids, Iowa, in a $63 million deal.

In March 2010, Alimentation Couche-Tard (operator of several convenience store chains, including Circle K) offered $1.9 billion for control of the company, and later announced a proxy fight for control.  Casey's rejected Couche-Tard's offer and was successful in September 2010 in retaining its board of directors vs. Couche-Tard's nominated slate.

While Casey's and Couche-Tard were battling for company control, in September 2010, 7-Eleven offered a $2 billion bid for control of the company.  Casey's and 7-Eleven engaged in discussions, but in November 2010 elected not to proceed with a merger.

Casey's announced in 2017 that it plans to open about 10 new locations in western Ohio.

Casey's announced plans in August 2018 to build a store in Huber Heights, Ohio.

In 2018 Casey's announced under increasing pressure from outside investors to adopt a range of new digital initiatives including a new Fleet Card, Mobile App, and loyalty program for Casey customers. The CEO announced in late 2018 the initiative would be complete by Quarter 1 of 2020.

In October 2020, Casey's announced a rebranding, including a new logo and dropping 'General Stores' from its name.

In November 2020, Casey's announced it was acquiring Omaha-based Bucky's Convenience Stores, a 94 store chain, in a $580 million deal.

In September 2021, Casey's purchased 38 Pilot Food Mart locations and two truck stop locations from Pilot Corporation. The locations, located in East Tennessee around the Knoxville area, were owned by the Haslam family outright and not part of the company's national truck stop chain jointly-owned by Pilot, Berkshire Hathaway, and FJ Management.

Recent expansions 
On October 12, 2010, Casey's announced the planned purchase of 19 "On The Way" stores in Illinois owned by Harper Oil Company, to be completed by November 2010 (Harper retained other stores and the On The Way name).
On October 28, 2010, Casey's announced the purchase of six "Short Stop" stores in Iowa owned by J.D. Carpenter Companies, Inc.
On November 3, 2010, Casey's announced the purchase of 44 "Kabredlo's" stores.  The purchase, expected to be completed by December 2010, would include 22 stores in Nebraska, 21 in Kansas, and the first Casey's location to operate in the state of Oklahoma.
On March 28, 2011, a Casey's General Store opened in Bella Vista, Arkansas, the chain's first store to operate in that state.
Casey's further solidified its Iowa base in June 2011 with the announced purchase of 22 Kum & Go stores in Iowa, bringing its total store number in the state to 473. At least for the time being, the Kum & Go stores will remain in the current buildings but be rebranded with signage.
On August 2, 2012, a Casey's General Store opened in Cadiz, Kentucky, the chain's first store to operate in that state.
On April 11, 2013, a Casey's General Store opened in Mountain Home, Arkansas.
Casey's is also present in Tennessee, with a store in Dyersburg, Tennessee.
On September 5, 2013, a Casey's General Store opened in DeSoto, Kansas, making it the third Casey's in the Kansas City Metropolitan Area.
On October 1, 2013, a Casey's General Store opened in Horace, North Dakota, the chain's first store to operate in that state. Later acquisitions of the Fargo-based Stop n Go in 2014 expanded the chain in North Dakota. 
On August 28, 2013, a Casey's General Store opened in Mayfield, Kentucky, only the chain's second store to operate in that state.
On August 21, 2014, a Casey's General Store opened in Clarksville, Arkansas.
On March 20, 2017, a Casey's General Store opened in Cridersville, Ohio, the first store to operate in the state.
On September 22, 2017, a Casey's General Store opened in Peru, Indiana, the first of two stores to be opened in the town.
On November 30, 2017, Casey's General Stores has opened its 2,000th location in Russellville, Kentucky.
On April 13, 2018, a Casey's General Store opened in Watervliet, Michigan, the chain's first store to operate in the state.
In the summer of 2019, Casey's opened their first store in the booming  college town of Lawrence, Kansas.
In October 2019 Casey's opened a store in Brooklyn Center, Minnesota.
In late 2019, there are Casey's General Stores approved for construction in the Eau Claire Area in central Wisconsin.
On May 22, 2020, Casey's opened a store in Xenia, Ohio.
In December 2020, Casey's opened a store in Shelbyville, Indiana.
 In April 2022, Casey's opened a store in Topeka, Kansas.

Operations

As of February 2022, Casey's has over 2,147 stores in 17 states. Casey's operates in the following states, most of which are in the Midwestern United States and the Plains States.

Arkansas
Illinois
Indiana
Iowa
Kansas
Kentucky
Michigan
Minnesota
Missouri
Nebraska
North Dakota
Ohio
Oklahoma
South Dakota
Tennessee
Wisconsin

References

External links 
 Official website
 Blog
 

Convenience_stores
Companies listed on the Nasdaq
Ankeny, Iowa
Companies based in Iowa
Economy of the Midwestern United States
Convenience stores of the United States
Retail companies established in 1968
1968 establishments in Iowa
American companies established in 1968